Gar Kandi Rasul Bakhsh Bazar (also Romanized as Gār Kandī Rasūl Bakhsh Bāzār; also known as Gar Kandī) is a village in Polan Rural District, Polan District, Chabahar County, Sistan and Baluchestan Province, Iran. At the 2006 census, its population was 418, in 78 families.

References 

Populated places in Chabahar County